Milda Dargužaitė (born 1976) is Lithuanian Manager, since December 2016 Chancellor in the Office of the Government of the Republic of Lithuania. She was the Managing General Director of Invest Lithuania.   She worked as  Co-head of the Strategic Asset Allocation Team at Goldman Sachs in New York City.

Biography 
Dargužaitė graduated from the High School in Kaunas and  lived in the United States of America for 17 years.

References

External links 
CV

1976 births
Living people
Businesspeople from Vilnius